Bonnie Prince Charlie, or Charles Edward Stuart (1720–1788), was the Jacobite claimant to the throne of Great Britain.

Bonnie Prince Charlie may also refer to:
Bonnie Prince Charlie (1923 film), a silent film starring Ivor Novello
Bonnie Prince Charlie (1948 film), a 1948 film starring David Niven
Bonnie Prince Charlie: A Tale of Fontenoy and Culloden, a novel by G. A. Henty